The Tom Green County Courthouse, at 100 W. Beauregard Ave. in San Angelo, Texas, is a Classical Revival courthouse with a monumental Corinthian column colonnades on two facades which was designed by architect Anton Korn and was built in 1928.  It was listed on the National Register of Historic Places in 1988.

It has a full entablature and a high roof parapet.  A curtain wall of glazed glass behind the columns provides contrast.

It was listed on the National Register as part of the San Angelo Multiple Resources study.

The J. B. Blakeney House, also in San Angelo and designed by Anton Korn, was also listed on the National Register as part of that study.

See also

National Register of Historic Places listings in Tom Green County, Texas
List of county courthouses in Texas

References

External links

Courthouses in Texas
Courthouses on the National Register of Historic Places in Texas
National Register of Historic Places in Tom Green County, Texas
Neoclassical architecture in Texas
Government buildings completed in 1928